Alan Cotter (born 23 September 1986) is a retired Irish rugby union player. He played as a prop.

Munster
Cotter joined the senior Munster squad at the beginning of the 2012–13 season, having earned a development contract after two years in the Munster Academy. Cotter made his senior Munster debut as a replacement against Connacht in the Pro12 on 27 December 2013. He signed a one-year development contract extension in March 2014.

Loan to London Irish
Cotter joined London Irish on a short-term loan in September 2012, replacing his Munster teammate John Ryan.

Loan to Bath
Cotter joined another Aviva Premiership side, Bath, on loan in November 2012.

Provence Rugby
In July 2015, Cotter moved to Aix-en-Provence in the south of France to play with the Pro D2 side Provence Rugby.

References

External links
Munster Profile
ESPN Profile

1986 births
Living people
People educated at St Munchin's College
Rugby union players from County Limerick
Irish rugby union players
Young Munster players
Munster Rugby players
London Irish players
Bath Rugby players
Provence Rugby players
Irish expatriate sportspeople in France
Expatriate rugby union players in France
Irish expatriate rugby union players
Rugby union props